Edilson Pereira do Santos (born on July 11, 1981) is a Brazilian football striker, who currently plays for Platense.

Club career
Edilson joined Marathón ahead of the 2011 Clausura

References

External links
 Profile - Marathón

1981 births
Living people
Brazilian footballers
Deportes Savio players
Platense F.C. players
C.D. Marathón players
Liga Nacional de Fútbol Profesional de Honduras players
Expatriate footballers in Honduras
Association football forwards
Sportspeople from Salvador, Bahia